Monte Verde (Portuguese meaning "green mountain") is a mountain in the eastern part of the island of São Vicente, Cape Verde. At 744 m elevation, it is the island's highest point.

Natural Park
The mountain is part of the Natural Park Monte Verde, covering . Due to its elevation, it is less arid than the rest of the island. All species and communities of endemic flora of São Vicente are concentrated in this area. Of the 93 inventoried species of flora, 17 are on the list of endangered species of São Vicente. In the inaccessible parts of Monte Verde there is a typical vegetation consisting of Limonium jovibarba, Sonchus daltonii, Lobularia canariensis subsp. fruticosa and Campylanthus glaber subsp. spathulatus.

See also
List of protected areas in Cape Verde

References

External links

Monte Verde on www.mindelo.info

Verde
Geography of São Vicente, Cape Verde
Protected areas of Cape Verde